Ivo Simović (born January 5, 1979) is a Serbian professional basketball coach, currently an assistant coach for the UCLA Bruins of the Pac-12 Conference.

Coaching career
Simović began his coaching career in 2001 with the Crvena zvezda youth system in Belgrade. During his time at the Zvezda, they won the 2004 National Championship and were runner-up in his final season in 2007.

NBA 
Simović spent two summers working as an assistant coach with the San Antonio Spurs during 2013 NBA Summer League and 2014 NBA Summer League season. He earned an NBA Championship ring from the team after the Spurs won the 2014 title.

NCAA assistant coach (2015–present)
Simović joined the Hartford Hawks coaching staff prior to the 2015-16 season as an assistant coach. He was promoted to associate head coach in November 2016.

On June 5, 2017, Simović was named an assistant coach for the Charlotte 49ers of the Conference USA.

On June 10, 2022, Simović was named an assistant coach for UCLA Bruins of the Pac-12 Conference, under head coach Mick Cronin.

Executive career 
Simović served as the sports director for CB Espacio Torrelodones of the Spanish EBA League (level 4) from 2007 to 2015, where he landed some of the top players in Madrid throughout his time there. They were the runner-up in the Primera Division – Community of Madrid Group during the 2011–12 season and were the fifth-best program in all of Spain in his final season. The club showed tremendous technical growth under Simović, and he mentored such coaches as Darko Rajaković.

Personal life 
Simović and his wife, Jelena, have two children, Ema and Marko.

References

External links 
 
 Coach Profile at usbasket.com
 Coach Profile at realgm.com

1979 births
Living people
KK Crvena zvezda youth coaches
Charlotte 49ers men's basketball coaches
Hartford Hawks men's basketball coaches
Loyola Greyhounds men's basketball coaches
UCLA Bruins men's basketball coaches
National Basketball Association scouts from Europe
People from Gornji Milanovac
San Antonio Spurs assistant coaches
Serbian basketball executives and administrators
Serbian basketball scouts
Serbian men's basketball coaches
Serbian expatriate basketball people in the United States
Serbian expatriate basketball people in Spain